Fort Custer may refer to:

Fort Custer (Montana), a historic U.S. Army fort in Montana, constructed in 1877, and abandoned in 1898
Fort Custer Training Center, a Michigan Army National Guard training facility in Michigan, built in 1917

See also
Fort Custer National Cemetery, Michigan
Fort Custer Recreation Area, Michigan